CEDT may refer to:
 Central European Summer Time
 Centre For Electronics Design And Technology
 Crimson Editor, a text editor with internal name "cedt.exe" .